The Shivsagar Lake is a reservoir in the state of Maharashtra, India. The lake was formed after the Koyna River was impounded by the Koyna Dam.

See also 
 Koyna Hydroelectric Project
 Koyna Dam
 Koyna Wildlife Sanctuary

References 

Reservoirs in Maharashtra
Monuments and memorials to Shivaji
Satara district